Jesse Harding Pomeroy (November 29, 1859 – September 29, 1932) was a convicted American murderer and the youngest person in the history of the Commonwealth of Massachusetts to be convicted of murder in the first degree. He was found guilty by a jury trial held in the Supreme Judicial Court of Suffolk County in December 1874. He was also a suspected serial killer.

Background

Jesse Harding Pomeroy was born in Charlestown, Massachusetts, to Thomas J. Pomeroy and Ruth Ann Snowman. He was the second of two children; his brother Charles Jefferson Pomeroy was two years older.  Thomas J. Pomeroy (1835–1898) was a veteran of the U.S. Civil War.

Reported attacks in 1871–1872

From 1871–1872, there were reports that several young boys were individually enticed to remote areas and attacked by a slightly older boy. However, no one was ever arrested. The attacks were noteworthy because of the extreme amount of brutality used by the assailant. The young boys were beaten with a fist and a belt and, in at least two of the attacks, a knife. Some of the boys were physically scarred permanently.

In 1872, Ruth and the two children moved to South Boston. Pomeroy's attacks on young boys continued, and he was finally arrested and his case heard in front of a Juvenile Court judge. Pomeroy was found guilty and sentenced to the State Reform School for Boys at Westborough, Massachusetts, for his minority (i.e., until he turned 18). The Boston Globe covered this story; the last line of the article: "It is generally concluded that the boy is mentally deficient."

Crimes

In February 1874, at the age of 14, Pomeroy was paroled back to his mother and brother in South Boston. His mother ran her own dressmaking shop, and his brother Charles sold newspapers.

In March 1874, a ten-year-old girl from South Boston named Katie Curran went missing. On April 22, 1874, the mutilated body of four-year-old Horace Millen was found on the marsh of Dorchester Bay. Immediately, the police detectives sought out Pomeroy, despite lacking evidence implicating him in the crime. The body of Katie Curran was found later, in the basement of Pomeroy's mother's dress shop. Her remains were hastily and carelessly concealed in an ash heap.

Trial

Pomeroy was taken to view Millen's body and asked if he committed the murder. At the coroner's inquest, Pomeroy was denied the right to counsel. 

The case of Commonwealth v. Pomeroy was heard in the Massachusetts Supreme Judicial Court (Suffolk County, Boston) on December 9 and December 10, 1874.  At the trial, the Attorney General argued for a verdict of guilty of murder in the first degree.  In his closing arguments, he urged an alternative charge of murder with extreme atrocity, which, according to Massachusetts law, is first-degree murder, but differs from the original charge in the requirement of premeditation. 

Pomeroy was pronounced guilty on December 10, 1874, with the jury's recommendation of mercy on account of the prisoner's youth. 

Pomeroy's attorney, Charles Robinson, filed two exceptions which were overruled in February 1875, at which point Pomeroy was sentenced to death by hanging.

After the trial

It remained for the Governor to sign the death warrant and assign a date for Pomeroy's execution. However, Governor William Gaston refused to comply with this executive responsibility. The only legal means of sparing Pomeroy's life was through the Massachusetts Governor's Council, and only if a simple majority of the nine-member Council voted to commute the death penalty. Over the next year and a half, the Council voted three times: the first two votes upheld Pomeroy's execution, and both times Governor Gaston refused to sign the death warrant.

In August 1876, the Council took a third vote, anonymously, and Pomeroy's sentence was commuted to life in prison in solitary confinement. On the evening of September 7, 1876, Pomeroy was transferred from the Suffolk County Jail to the State Prison at Charlestown, and began his life in solitary. He was 16 years and 9 months old. Pomeroy remained incarcerated at the Charlestown State Prison.

In prison, Pomeroy claimed that he taught himself to read several foreign languages, including Hebrew; and one visiting psychiatrist found that he had learned German with "considerable accuracy". He wrote poetry and argued with prison officials over his right to have it published, and he studied law books and spent decades composing legal challenges to his conviction and requests for a pardon. A psychiatric report on Pomeroy made in 1914, and quoted extensively in The Boston Globe after his death, noted that Pomeroy had made 10 or 12 "determined attempts" to escape and that handmade tools were frequently found in his possession.

A prison warden reported finding rope, steel pens, and a drill that Pomeroy had concealed in his cell or on his person. According to The Globe, Pomeroy lost an eye after attempting to destroy the side of his cell by redirecting a gas pipe. The 1914 psychiatric report claimed that Pomeroy had shown the "greatest ingenuity and a persistence which is unprecedented in the history of the prison."

In 1917, with the support of District Attorney Joseph Pelletier, Pomeroy's sentence was commuted to the extent of allowing him the privileges afforded to other life prisoners. At first he resisted, wanting nothing less than a pardon. He eventually adjusted to his changed circumstances and appeared in a minstrel show at the prison. In 1929, by this time an elderly man in frail health, he was transferred to Bridgewater Hospital for the Criminally Insane, where he died on September 29, 1932.

In popular culture 

 Jesse Pomeroy appears in the novel The Alienist by Caleb Carr, and was subsequently featured in the TNT television adaptation, played by Stephen Louis Grush.
 Fiend: The Shocking True Story of America's Youngest Serial Killer by Harold Schechter.
 The Wilderness of Ruin: A Tale of Madness, Fire, and the Hunt for America's Youngest Serial Killer by Roseanne Montillo.
 My Favorite Murder episode 116 - Robot Grandma is partially about Jesse Pomeroy.
 The Law & Order: Special Victims Unit season 4 episode 25 "Soulless" is inspired by Jesse Pomeroy.
 Serial Killers podcast episode 169 - The Boy Torturer of Boston pt. 1 and episode 170 - The Boy Torturer of Boston pt. 2.
 Payback 2 features Pomeroy but only named him Jesse, much like the rest of the game's characters.
● Once Upon A Crime - A True Crime Podcast: Episode 005: Killer Kids: Jesse Pomeroy

See also 

 List of serial killers in the United States

References

External links

 Court TV's Crime Library: Mark Gribben, "All about Jesse Pomeroy"
 Kobek.com Presents "The Autobiography of Jesse Harding Pomeroy, Written By Himself (1875)" (Archive)
 Kobek.com Presents "Selections From the Writings of Jesse Harding Pomeroy, Life Prisoner Since 1876 (1920)" (Archive)
 Jesse Harding Pomeroy: The teenaged killer
 

1859 births
1874 murders in the United States
1932 deaths
American male criminals
American murderers of children
American people convicted of murder
American people who died in prison custody
American prisoners sentenced to death
Deaths in mental institutions
Minors convicted of murder
People convicted of murder by Massachusetts
People from Charlestown, Boston
Prisoners sentenced to death by Massachusetts
Prisoners who died in Massachusetts detention
Recipients of American gubernatorial clemency
Suspected serial killers
Violence against children